Georges Léon Eugène Marie Dambois (born 26 March 1887) was a Belgian fencer. He competed in the team épée event at the 1928 Summer Olympics.

References

External links
 

1887 births
Year of death missing
Belgian male fencers
Olympic fencers of Belgium
Fencers at the 1928 Summer Olympics